Bojan Regoje (born 2 December 1981) is a Bosnian retired professional footballer who played as a defender.

International career
He made his debut for Bosnia and Herzegovina in a January 2008 friendly match away against Japan and has earned a total of 2 caps, scoring no goals. His second and final international was a June 2008 friendly against Azerbaijan.

Honours
Slavija Sarajevo
First League of RS: 2003–04
Bosnian Cup: 2008–09
Republika Srpska Cup: 2005–06, 2007–08

Olimpik
Bosnian Cup: 2014–15

References

External links

Bojan Regoje at Soccerway

1981 births
Living people
Footballers from Sarajevo
Association football defenders
Bosnia and Herzegovina footballers
Bosnia and Herzegovina international footballers
FK Slavija Sarajevo players
FK Olimpik players
NK Čelik Zenica players
FK Mladost Doboj Kakanj players
First League of the Republika Srpska players
Premier League of Bosnia and Herzegovina players